Jack Wall is the name of:

Jack Wall (composer) (born 1964), American video game music composer
John Wall (electronic composer) (born 1950), English electronic composer
Jack Wall (politician) (born 1945), Irish Labour Party politician
Jack Wall (rugby league), Australian rugby player of the 1940s and the 1950s

See also
John Wall (disambiguation)